Don't Stop the Music is the third studio album by Swedish pop singer Robyn. It was released on 30 October 2002 in Sweden by BMG. The album peaked at number two in her native Sweden, and the two singles "Keep This Fire Burning" and "Don't Stop the Music" were both top 10 hits. In 2003, Don't Stop the Music was certified platinum by IFPI, and has sold over 60,000 copies in Sweden.

The song "Should Have Known" also appears on Robyn's self-titled fourth studio album from 2005 in a re-recorded version. Despite the album's two singles being released through most of Europe, the album was only available in Sweden and Japan until 2019, when it received a worldwide digital release on Konichiwa Records.

Track listing

  signifies an additional producer
  signifies a vocal producer

Charts and certifications

Weekly charts

Year-end charts

Certifications

Release history

References

External links
 

2002 albums
Robyn albums
Jive Records albums
Albums produced by Guy Sigsworth
Albums produced by Ghost (production team)
Albums produced by Max Martin